James Gemmell (17 November 1880 – after 1911) was a Scottish footballer who played in the Football League for Stoke, Sunderland and Leeds City as an inside forward.

Club career
Gemmell was born in Glasgow and played for Duntocher Hibernian and Clyde before joining Sunderland in 1900. He made his debut for Sunderland on 8 December 1900 against Sheffield Wednesday in a 1–0 win at Roker Park. He was at Sunderland in two different spells; in 1900–07 and 1910–12 respectively, separated by a stay at Leeds United. During his first stay at Sunderland, he won the 1902 English Football League Championship. Gemmell made 213 league appearances for Sunderland, scoring 46 goals.

In 1907 Gemmell signed for Second Division Stoke but after making 11 appearances scoring twice he was sold to Leeds City due to Stoke having serious financial difficulties.

Career statistics
Source:

Honours
 Sunderland
 Football League First Division champions: 1901–02

References
 Jimmy Gemmell's careers stats at The Stat Cat

1880 births
Scottish footballers
Duntocher Hibernian F.C. players
Clyde F.C. players
Sunderland A.F.C. players
Stoke City F.C. players
Leeds City F.C. players
Third Lanark A.C. players
West Stanley F.C. players
English Football League players
Year of death missing
Association football inside forwards